Anthony Cook (born 17 September 1976) is an English former footballer who played in the Football League as a midfielder for Colchester United.

Career
Born in Hemel Hempstead, Cook began his career at Queens Park Rangers when he was just 11 years old and then went on as a youth apprentice with Football League club Colchester United, making his debut for the first-team on 11 January 1994 in a Football League Trophy third round 1–0 defeat to Wycombe Wanderers, alongside fellow debutants Justin Booty, John Cheesewright and Grant Watts. He came on as a substitute for Booty. He made two appearances in the Football League, the first coming on 30 April 1994 in a 3–1 home victory over Doncaster Rovers, a match in which he started, and his final appearance came in the following game, a 2–0 away defeat to Carlisle United, coming on for Steve Ball.

After leaving Colchester, Cook went on to play for a number of non-league clubs including Berkhamsted Town, Wivenhoe Town, Hemel Hempstead Town, Chelmsford City and Tring Athletic.

References

1976 births
Association football midfielders
Berkhamsted Town F.C. players
Chelmsford City F.C. players
Colchester United F.C. players
English footballers
Footballers from Hertfordshire
Sportspeople from Hemel Hempstead
Hemel Hempstead Town F.C. players
Living people
English Football League players
Tring Athletic F.C. players
Wivenhoe Town F.C. players